The Rules of Decision Act mandates that substantive state law be applied in state cases, unless the United States Constitution, treaties of the United States, or acts of Congress say otherwise. The federal courts' authority to exercise general federal common law in state cases sitting in diversity jurisdiction was made possible by the Rules of Decision Act.  This was later overturned in Erie Railroad Co. v. Tompkins. In significant part, the rule authorizes congress to make rules that must be followed by the federal courts. This later becomes problematic when a collision between substantive state right laws conflict with federal rules of procedure.

This act came from Section 34 of the Judiciary Act of 1789.

It states that:

Its interpretation, especially the meaning of "the laws of the several states", was central to the issue in Erie Railroad Co. v. Tompkins.

At this time, the term "State" includes any State of the United States, the District of Columbia, the Commonwealth of Puerto Rico, the United States Virgin Islands, American Samoa, Guam, and the Northern Mariana Islands. .

See also 
Conflict of laws
Swift v. Tyson

United States federal judiciary legislation